London Film and Comic Con is a fan convention held annually in London that focuses on films, cult television, gaming, anime, cosplay and comics. It is organised by	Showmasters Ltd.

History and organization
London Film & Comic Con began in 2004 and is organised by Showmasters, the same company that organises the Autographica and Collectormania events. In the past, the convention had guests that had included actors and actresses from film and television series including Doctor Who, Star Trek, Star Wars, Harry Potter, Heroes and others.

The convention holds a large dealers hall selling movie, comic and science fiction related memorabilia and original film props, along with guest talks, professional photo shoots, autograph sessions, cosplay events, and displays.

The 2014 LFCC was the venue for the one-and-only presentation of the True Believer Comic Awards, the successor to the long-running Eagle Awards. The inaugural True Believer Comics Awards were presented 12 July 2014, at the LFCC, with host Anthony Stewart Head and featuring a special appearance by Stan Lee. They have not been awarded since.

COVID-19 pandemic
The 2020 LFCC was originally planned for July 2020, however due to the COVID-19 pandemic it was initially delayed to November 2020 before being delayed again to July 2021. The LFCC Spring that was due to be held in February 2021 was cancelled. It officially returned in November 2021.

Venue
In 2004, London Film & Comic Con was held at Wembley Exhibition Centre before being moved to Earls Court in 2005. LFCC was hosted at Earls Court every year until 2014 with the exception of 2012 when it was hosted in Olympia due to the London Olympics. In 2015, LFCC made a full-time move to Olympia as Earls Court was demolished.

Show features

Cosplay 
Members of the public are allowed, and in many cases encouraged, to take part in cosplay. Cosplaying has become one of the most popular parts of London Film and Comic. This can be to show off the costumer's latest work, to show devotion to their favourite characters or engage in role-play with other cosplayers in the same series, as well as to meet new people with mutual interests.

Guests 
Guests from popular media are commonly invited to the convention. They take part for a variety of reasons. Often, this is to promote their latest product or production whether it be movie, TV or print. Sometimes it can be to raise awareness and funds for a charity or cause important to them.

Autographs 
The event also includes an autograph area where big names in film and TV sign items for the public.

Retro Gaming area
LFCC has an area dedicated to retro gaming consoles for public to play.

Comic Zone
LFCC dedicated area for members of the public to meet and engage with comic creators. The Comic Zone also holds specialist talks from comic creators as well as smaller symposiums, designed to act as masterclasses for creators exhibiting in Artist's alley.

Location and dates

See also

 AUKcon
 Caption (comics convention)
 Eastercon
 EGX (expo)
 Fandom
 For the Love of Sci-Fi
 Hyper Japan
 List of multigenre conventions
 London Super Comic Convention
 Memorabilia (event)
 MCM London Comic Con
 Microcon
 Thought Bubble Festival
 United Kingdom Comic Art Convention
 UK Games Expo

References

External links

 
 Showmasters Official Website
 Review of London Film and Comic Con 2012

Comics conventions
Multigenre conventions
Fan conventions
Science fiction conventions in the United Kingdom
British fan conventions
Recurring events established in 2004
Events in London